o-Tolylthiourea is a highly toxic chemical compound.

References

Thioureas
Anilines